Igor Šemrinec (born 22 November 1987) is a Slovak football goalkeeper who plays for MFK Skalica.

Career

AS Trenčín
Šemrinec made his first Corgoň Liga appearance against ViOn Zlaté Moravce.

Career statistics

Honours

Club
AS Trenčín
 Fortuna Liga (2): 2014–15, 2015-16
Slovnaft Cup (2): 2014–15, 2015-16

External links
AS Trenčín profile

References

1987 births
Living people
Sportspeople from Bojnice
Slovak footballers
Association football goalkeepers
FC Baník Prievidza players
AS Trenčín players
AFC Nové Mesto nad Váhom players
FC Košice (2018) players
MFK Skalica players
Slovak Super Liga players
3. Liga (Slovakia) players